Coleophora maroccana is a moth of the family Coleophoridae.

References

maroccana
Moths described in 1995